Aldrington railway station, sometimes known by its former names of Aldrington Halt and Dyke Junction, is a railway station that serves the area of Aldrington in Hove, in East Sussex, England.

Dyke Junction Halt was opened in 1905 by the London, Brighton and South Coast Railway with short wooden platforms.  In 1932 new longer platforms were constructed on an adjacent site nearer Hove to the previous platforms. They were renamed Aldrington Halt and later rebuilt in concrete by the Southern Railway.  It is situated just east of the former junction with the branch line to Devil's Dyke, which opened in 1887 and closed in 1939; the layout and curvature of certain roads and buildings immediately north-west of the station indicates where the branch ran.

The station was staffed during peak hours until approximately 1990, after which the hut which served as a ticket office was demolished. By 2009 the old concrete shelters had been replaced with reinforced plastic shelters which are now the only features on the platforms. Ramps lead down to street level.

There are ticket-issuing machines at the entrances to each platform. Pre-purchased tickets can also be collected on these machines. There is no footbridge connecting the platforms with each other. However, there is a tunnel under the railway lines at the western end of the platforms which was originally built to allow the local farmer to move his cattle between fields which became separated with the arrival of the railway.

History

Opened by the London, Brighton and South Coast Railway, it became part of the Southern Railway during the Grouping of 1923. The line then passed on to the  Southern Region of British Railways on nationalisation in 1948.

When Sectorisation was introduced, the station was served by Network SouthEast until the privatisation of British Rail.

Services 
All services at Aldrington are operated by Southern using  EMUs.

The typical off-peak service in trains per hour is:
 1 tph to 
 1 tph to 

References 
References

Sources

External links 

Railway stations in Brighton and Hove
DfT Category F1 stations
Former London, Brighton and South Coast Railway stations
Railway stations in Great Britain opened in 1905
Railway stations served by Govia Thameslink Railway